Interlink Electronics, Inc. is a technology company that specializes in manufacturing sensors that are used in electronic portable devices, such as smartphones, GPS systems, and in industrial computers and systems controls.

History
Interlink was founded on April 30, 1996, and released the first force-sensing resistor for commercial use in 1977.

In 2001, Interlink helped Microsoft design the controller for the Xbox.

Legal 
Interlink Electronics filed a patent-infringement lawsuit against Nintendo in December 2006 over the pointing functionality of the Wii Remote, claiming "loss of reasonable royalties, reduced sales and/or lost profits as a result of the infringing activities" of Nintendo. The lawsuit was dismissed by Interlink in March 2007.

References

External links 
Interlink Electronics website
FSR(tm)

Computer companies of the United States
1984 establishments in California
Electronics companies established in 1984
Electronics companies of the United States